Rockefeller is a German surname, originally given to people from the now-abandoned village of Rockenfeld near Neuwied in the Rhineland and commonly referring to subjects associated with the Rockefeller family. It may refer to:

People with the name

Rockefeller family

John D. Rockefeller Sr. (1839–1937), founder of the Standard Oil Company
Laura Spelman Rockefeller (1839–1915), wife of John D.R., namesake of Spelman College
William Rockefeller (1841–1922), brother of John D.R.
Bessie Rockefeller Strong (1866–1906), daughter of John D.R.
Alice Rockefeller (1869–1870), daughter of John D.R.
Alta Rockefeller Prentice (1871–1962), daughter of John D.R., founder Alta House (settlement house)
Edith Rockefeller McCormick (1872–1932), daughter of John D.R., feminist, philanthropist
John D. Rockefeller Jr. (Junior) (1874–1960), son of Senior
Abby Aldrich Rockefeller (1874–1948), wife of Junior
Percy Avery Rockefeller (1878–1934), son of William
Margaret Rockefeller Strong de Larraín, Marquesa de Cuevas (1897–1985), daughter of Bessie Rockefeller Strong, granddaughter of Laura Spellman Rockefeller and John D. Rockefeller
James Stillman Rockefeller (1902–2004), grandson of William, a gold medal winner at the 1924 Paris Olympics, president of The First National City Bank of New York, now Citibank
John D. Rockefeller III (1906–1978), third-generation, grandson of John D.R.
Nelson Rockefeller (1908–1979), third-generation, 41st vice president of the United States and 49th governor of New York
Laurance Rockefeller (1910–2004), third-generation, conservationist
Winthrop Rockefeller (1912–1973), third-generation, governor of Arkansas
David Rockefeller (1915–2017), third-generation, banker and statesman, founder of the Trilateral Commission
John D. "Jay" Rockefeller IV (born 1937), fourth-generation, Democratic U.S. Senator for West Virginia
Michael Rockefeller (1938 – ), fourth-generation, youngest son of Nelson and his first wife
Winthrop Paul Rockefeller (1948–2006), Republican lieutenant governor of Arkansas
Richard Rockefeller (1949–2014), fourth-generation, physician, son of David
Mark Rockefeller (born 1967), fourth-generation, son of Nelson

Other people with the name

 Alan Rockefeller, American mycologist

Clark Rockefeller (born Christian Karl Gerhartsreiter, 1961), convicted murderer and impostor
Jim Rockefeller, inventor of the Rockefeller Yankee, a fiberglass-bodied sports car
Lewis K. Rockefeller (1875–1948), US Representative from New York, Republican; not a member of the John D. Rockefeller branch of the family dynasty

Places
John D. Rockefeller Jr. Memorial Parkway, a road between Yellowstone National Park and Grand Teton National Park
Laurance S. Rockefeller Preserve, a preserved area within Grand Teton National Park
Rockefeller State Park Preserve, a state park in New York State

Arts, entertainment, and media
Beto Rockfeller, a 1968 Brazilian telenovela
 "Rockefeller Street," a song by Estonian singer Getter Jaani
Rockefeller Street (album), the song's parent album
 "The Rockafeller Skank", a song by British musician Fatboy Slim

Institutions
Rockefeller Brothers Fund, principal third-generation philanthropy
Rockefeller Center, a major New York City building complex
Rockefeller College, a residential college at Princeton University
Rockefeller Foundation, principal family philanthropic organization
Rockefeller Group, former owner of Rockefeller Center
Rockefeller Institute of Government, a public policy research unit which conducts studies related to government in the United States
Rockefeller Museum, an archaeological museum in Jerusalem
Rockefeller Music Hall, a music venue in Oslo, Norway
Rockefeller University, a private research university in New York City

Other uses
 Oysters Rockefeller, a dish made with oysters
Rockefeller drug laws

See also
Cinderella Rockefella, a novelty song, a hit for Esther and Abi Ofarim in 1968
Roc-A-Fella Records, a large American hip hop record label
 Mike Rockenfeller, a German racing driver
 Rockefeller Republican

References

Americanized surnames
German-language surnames
Rockefeller family
Toponymic surnames